Lye Siew Weng was a Malaysian politician. He was a member of the Penang State Legislative Assembly, representing Air Itam between 1995 and 2004, then  Air Putih as well as Deputy Speaker from 2004 to 2008. 

Before politics he was teacher, primary school headmaster and social worker

He died of bone cancer on 28 February 2018, aged 77.

Election results

Honours
 :
 Officer of the Order of the Defender of the Realm (K.M.N.) (2002)
 :
 Officer of the Order of the Defender of State (D.S.P.N.) – Dato' (2006)

References

1940s births
2018 deaths
Members of the Penang State Legislative Assembly
Deaths from cancer in Malaysia
Deaths from bone cancer
Malaysian Chinese Association politicians
Officers of the Order of the Defender of the Realm